Peter Gallagher (15 April 1941 – 15 September 2015) is an Australian former rugby league footballer. He played in the New South Wales Rugby Football League premiership for the Eastern Suburbs club from 1960 until 1965. He played mainly at  but was a versatile player who could play most positions in the backline. In the 1965 season, Gallagher captained the Eastern Suburbs team and was a member of the Easts side that lost to St. George in the 1960 Grand Final. The following year Gallagher moved to the Manly club, remaining there until 1968. In his time at Manly Gallagher played most of his football on the Wing.

Background
Peter Gallagher was born in Taree, New South Wales. Australia.

References
The Encyclopedia of Rugby League; Alan Whiticker & Glen Hudson
Peter Gallagher at nrlstats.com
Peter Gallagher at yesterdayshero.com.au

Living people
Australian rugby league players
Manly Warringah Sea Eagles players
Rugby league players from Taree
Sydney Roosters players
1941 births
2015 deaths